The Porto Marathon is an annual marathon race in the city of Porto, Portugal, held in October or November, since 2004.

Along with the marathon, several races of shorter distances are arranged as well. The marathon is sponsored by Energias de Portugal. 

In 2009, 857 athletes competed the marathon. In 2010, 1180 athletes competed the marathon. In 2013, 2755 athletes competed the marathon, becoming the largest marathon in Portugal.

The 2020 edition of the race was postponed to 2021 due to the coronavirus pandemic, with all registrants given the option of transferring their entry to another runner or to 2022.

Winners and finishers 
Key:

Gallery

Notes

References

External links
 Official Site
 marathoninfo

Marathons in Portugal
Autumn events in Portugal
Annual sporting events in Portugal
Sports festivals in Portugal
Recurring sporting events established in 2004
2004 establishments in Portugal
Sports competitions in Porto
21st century in Porto